The Levesque triplets are identical triplets named Andrea, Arianna and Athena Levesque. They are models, TV personalities and actresses.

Career 
They are recognized by their TV segments on shows such as MTV, The Drew Barrymore Show, Good Morning America, and The Dr. Oz Show, and for walking as models during New York Fashion Week. For their second segment on Good Morning America the triplets modeled makeup looks by celebrity makeup artist Mario Dedivanovic, Kim Kardashian's makeup artist. The triplets modeled looks styled by Hayley Hasselhoff on Strahan, Sara and Keke in December 2019.

The sisters were cast as "singing triplets" in Halloween Kills, released in October 2021.

Andrea, Arianna and Athena have participated in various dating segments including May the Best Twin Win for MTV, the reboot of Singled Out (also on MTV), and Bestie Picks Bae for Seventeen.

The triplets modeled gowns styled by Hollywood stylists for E! Live from the Red Carpet Countdown to the Oscars in 2018.  The design segment required identical models to create Wonder Woman–inspired red carpet looks.

Andrea Levesque is a YA LGBT mystery author and voice actress. In 2021 she published two books in her Rose and Compass series, There Can Only Be Six, and its sequel, There Can Only Be Blood. The third installment in the series, There Can Only Be Secrets, was released in 2022.

Early life 
The Levesque triplets were born in Boston and raised on Cape Cod, Massachusetts. They were born prematurely, two minutes apart. Their parents dressed them the same until first grade. Arianna has a degree in Fashion Design from the Fashion Institute of Technology. 
Andrea has a master's degree in School Psychology from Tufts University. 
Athena has a Master's in Education from the University of Massachusetts Amherst.

March of Dimes involvement 
Andrea, Arianna and Athena have been actively volunteering with the March of Dimes since they were born. At 4 years old they served as ambassadors for the March of Dimes and continued volunteering with them as they got older. "The Levesques’ first taste of life in the public eye actually came about years before that, when they had just turned 4 years old and were selected as March of Dimes ambassadors on Cape Cod.

[T]he triplets benefited from life-saving treatments developed by the March of Dimes.

As preschoolers, they participated in a March of Dimes telethon in Hyannis and appeared at fundraiser walks."

References

External links 
 

People from Barnstable County, Massachusetts
Triplets
Female models from Massachusetts
People from Boston
Year of birth missing (living people)
Living people
21st-century American women